Ivakovo is a rural locality (a village) in Terebayevskoye Rural Settlement, Nikolsky District, Vologda Oblast, Russia. The population was 6 as of 2002.

Geography 
Ivakovo is located 32 km north of Nikolsk (the district's administrative centre) by road. Kovrigino is the nearest rural locality.

References 

Rural localities in Nikolsky District, Vologda Oblast